Esqueda is a surname. Notable people with the surname include:

Diego Esqueda (born 1988), Mexican footballer
Enrique Esqueda (born 1988), Mexican footballer
Luis Ricardo Esqueda (born 1981), Mexican footballer
Rafael Márquez Esqueda (1947–2002), Mexican footballer